Naomi Ruth Goldenberg is a professor at the University of Ottawa. Her regular undergraduate courses include Gender and Religion, Women and Religions, Psychology of Religion and Method and Theory in the Study of Religion. Goldenberg is best known for her work in the areas of Feminist Theory and Religion, Gender and Religion, as well as the Psychoanalytic Theory and Political Theory of Religion. She is one of the early members of the Women's Caucus at the American Academy of Religion and Society of Biblical Literature and continues to work on and support scholarship in areas of religion and feminism, psychoanalytic theory, women's issues, gender. Currently, Goldenberg is writing about understanding religions as vestigial states.  Her theory demystifies religion in order to continue the feminist critique she articulated in her earlier work.

Early life and education 
Born in 1947 in Brooklyn, New York, Naomi Ruth Goldenberg grew up in Teaneck, New Jersey. She attended Teaneck High School and graduated with High Honors in Classics from Douglass College in New Brunswick, New Jersey in 1969. After beginning graduate work in Classics at Princeton University, she switched to Religious Studies at Yale University where she received an M.A. in 1974, an M.Phil. in 1975, and a Ph.D. in 1976. for her graduate work. Goldenberg studied at the C.G. Jung Institute in Zürich, Switzerland during her doctoral program.

Academic career 

Goldenberg is a full professor in the Department of Classics and Religious Studies at the University of Ottawa University of Ottawa where she has been employed since 1977. She served as Director of Women’s Studies from 1989-1992. Her graduate and undergraduate courses cover topics related to psychoanalysis, politics, gender, popular culture and mythology.

Awards and honours 
Goldenberg has received many honourable prizes and recognized for her work.

 1966 Cornelison Prize for Latin translation, Douglass College 
 1967 Phi Beta Kappa Sophomore prize, Douglass College 
 1968 Phi Beta Kappa, Douglass College 
 1969-70 Woodrow Wilson Fellow and University Fellow, Princeton University 
 1975-76 Woodrow Wilson Dissertation Fellow in Women's Studies, Yale University 
 1980 Merit increase for excellence in teaching at the University of Ottawa 
 2004 William C. Bier Award, American Psychological Association
 2004 Excellence in Education Prize, University of Ottawa

Published works

Books 

Changing of the Gods: Feminism and the End of Traditional Religions (1979)
The End of God (1982)
Returning Words to Flesh: Feminism, Psychoanalysis, and the Resurrection of the Body (1990)
Resurrecting the Body: Feminism, Religion and Psychoanalysis (1993)
Encyclopedia of Women and World Religion (2007, editor)
Religion As a Category of Governance and Sovereignty (2015, editor, with Trevor Stack and Timothy Fitzgerald)

Journal articles 

 "Theorizing Religions as Vestigial States in Relation to Gender and Law: Three Cases"
 "A Gentle Critique of Mourning Religion"
 "What's God Got to do with it? A call for problematizing Basic Terms in the Feminist Analysis of Religion"  
 "Thought on the 20th Birthday of the Journal of Feminist Studies in Religion" 
 "Witched and Words"
 "Memories of Marija Gimbutas and the King's Archaeologist
 "Interview"

See also 

List of religious studies scholars 
psychology of religion
Goddess movement
Matriarchal religion 
Mother goddess 
Matriarchy

References

1947 births
People from Teaneck, New Jersey
Teaneck High School alumni
Academic staff of the University of Ottawa
Princeton University alumni
Yale University alumni
Living people